Dragons of Underearth is a 1982 role-playing game published by Metagaming Concepts.

Gameplay
Dragons of Underearth is a game designed to be fully compatible with The Fantasy Trip.

Reception
Paul Manz reviewed Dragons of Underearth in The Space Gamer No. 55. Manz commented that "Dragons of Underearth is a simple FRP game that anyone new to the gaming field can learn.  For those of you just starting out, it's a worthwhile game [...]  Anyone who already has TFT products would be advised to stay away from this one, unless you're into counters or have got money waiting to be spent."

References

Fantasy role-playing games
Metagaming Concepts games